Akya is a new-generation heavyweight torpedo developed by Roketsan for the Turkish Navy. As of 2021, its tests completed, and it went in serial production. "Akya" is the Turkish name of Leerfish.

History
The heavyweight torpedo project was initiated by the ArMerKom ("Research Center Command") of the Turkish Navy in 2009. Roketsan was signed for the realization. The serial production of Akya started in 2021 after the test firings successfully completed in 2020, which began by July 2013. It is planned that the Reis-class, Preveze-class and Gür-class submarines will be eqipped with Akya. It will replace the torpedoes of type Mk 14, Mk 23, Mk 24 (Tigerfish) Mod.2 , Mk 37 Mod.2 & Mod.3 and SST-4 Mod.0.

Features
It has a proximity sensor and an underwater shock-insensitive warhead  in weight. Externally wire-guided with a fiber-optic cable, the heavyweight torpedo has active/passive sonar head and is capable of acoustic countermeasure, wake homing.

See also
 DM2A4
Mk 48
Varunastra (torpedo)
Black Shark
Spearfish
Tigerfish
Baek Sang Eo (White Shark)
Type 89
Type 65
Yu-6

References

Torpedoes of Turkey
Military equipment introduced in the 2000s
Akya